Ozana is a monotypic moth genus in the family Noctuidae erected by Emilio Berio in 1950. Its only species, Ozana chinensis, was first described by John Henry Leech in 1900. It is found in China.

Subspecies
Ozana chinensis indica Warren, 1913

References

Acontiinae
Monotypic moth genera